Vedavathi Alladhu Seetha Jananam is a 1941 Indian Tamil-language Hindu mythological film directed by T. R. Raghunath. The film featured M. R. Krishnamoorthy and K. Thavamani Devi in the lead roles.

Cast
The names in this list were adapted from the film poster.

Male cast
M. R. Krishnamoorthi as Naradar
R. Balasubramaniam  as Ravanan
P. G. Venkatesan  as Vibhishanan
M. G. Ramchandar  as Indrajit
V. S. Mani  as Ramar - Vishnu
V. Nataraj  as Bhrahaspathi - Naradar
M. G. Chakrapani  as Janakar - Kuberan
P. S. Veerappan  as Indran
S. Nandaram  as Yaman
K. S. Velayutham  as Nandhi - Hanuman
N. S. Velappan  as Nalakooparan
V. Srinivasa Sastri  as Agni
K. Ramaswamy Iyer  as Kumbakarnan
S. Ramudu  as Varunan
P. Govindasamy  as Sivan
T. V. Krishnaswamy  as Sooriyan
 P. Lakshmanasami as Lakshmanan
M. Sankararaman  as Vaayu
A. C. Sundaram  as Messenger

Female cast
Kolar Rajam  as Mandodhari
K. Thavamani Devi  as Vedavathi - Seetha
Kumari Rukmini  as Rambai
M. S. Saroja  as Menaka
T. N. Sundaramma  as Lakshmi
M. V. Kunjammal  as Urvasi
M. S. Sundarambal  as Thilothama
G. S. Saraswathi  as Bhoodevi
V. S. Kausalya  as Parvathi
Visalakshi  as Soorpanagai
Aakasa Vani
N. S. Krishnan  
T. A. Mathuram

Crew
The names in this list was adapted from the film poster.
Producer – Raja Chandrasekar
Director – T. R. Raghunath
Cinematography – T. E. Cooper
Audiography – A. Krishnaiyer
Art – F. Nagoor
Studio – Newtone

Production
Most of the early films in Tamil were reproduction of stage dramas. Some films even opened with a screen going up. The stage dramas usually had a main title and an alternate title. Thus this film also had two titles.

A comedy short film titled Aakaasa Vaani featuring N. S. Krishnan and T. A. Mathuram was included in the film.

Soundtrack
Music was composed by T. K. Jeyarama Iyer while the lyrics were penned by Papanasam Sivan and P. R. Rajagopala Iyer. M. R. Krishnamoorthy and K. Thavamani Devi sang most of the songs.

References

External links

Films based on the Ramayana
Indian epic films
Indian black-and-white films
Films directed by T. R. Raghunath